Yves Simplice Mboussi (born 30 May 1987 in Bafia, Cameroon) is Cameroonian footballer who plays for Vietnamese football club Hà Nội playing in V-League. He plays in defender.

From 2009 to 2010, he played for Hungarian club Nyíregyháza Spartacus in Nemzeti Bajnokság II.

From 2010 to 2011, he played for Moldovan club Milsami in Moldovan National Division.

References 

1987 births
Living people
People from Centre Region (Cameroon)
Cameroonian footballers
Association football defenders
AC Bellinzona players
FC Lugano players
Nyíregyháza Spartacus FC players
Vecsés FC footballers
FC Milsami Orhei players
Hanoi FC players
V.League 1 players
Kisvárda FC players
Nemzeti Bajnokság I players
Cameroonian expatriate footballers
Expatriate footballers in Switzerland
Expatriate footballers in Hungary
Expatriate footballers in Moldova
Expatriate footballers in Vietnam
Cameroonian expatriate sportspeople in Switzerland
Cameroonian expatriate sportspeople in Hungary
Cameroonian expatriate sportspeople in Moldova
Cameroonian expatriate sportspeople in Vietnam